Hallgrímur Jónasson (born 4 May 1986) is an Icelandic footballer who plays for Knattspyrnufélag Akureyrar in the Úrvalsdeild karla.

Club career
Hallgrímur was born at Húsavík and his youth club is Völsungur. With them he managed to play only one season in 2nd division (2002) when he was 16 years old. He then moved to Þór Akureyri and was with them for 3 seasons in 1st division before moving with this coach from Þór to Keflavík who played in the Icelandic Premier league. With Keflavík, Hallgrímur made a name for himself and was used as a left back, central defender, central midfielder and as a right winger. He made his debut with the Icelandic national team on 16 March 2008 against Faroe Islands and played 10 games for the U21 national team and captained the team as well.

Völsungur
Played with them through their youth system and one season with the first team in 2002, then 16 years old. He played 12 matches and scored 3 goals.

Þór Akureyri
With Þór, he played for 3 seasons, 35 matches and 3 goals. At Þór his coach was Kristján Guðmundsson who moved on to manage Keflavík and took Hallgrímur with him.

Keflavík
At Keflavík, Hallgrímur played 49 matches and scored 4 goals. He mainly played as a central defender or midfielder and made a name for himself in Iceland there.

GAIS
Hallgrímur was signed to GAIS by Magnus Pehrsson who never managed him as he moved on to AaB in Denmark. Hallgrímur had an operation in November 2008 and therefore missed the whole pre-season for the 2009 season. In the end of his first season Hallgrimur secured a place in the starting line up and played 5 matches that season. In the following season, Hallgrímur was ever present in the starting line up and is now considered a key player for the team as a central defender.

International

International goals
Scores and results list Iceland's goal tally first.

References

External links
 Info on Melar Sport homepage 
 

1986 births
Living people
Hallgrimur Jonasson
Hallgrimur Jonasson
Hallgrimur Jonasson
Hallgrimur Jonasson
Association football midfielders
Hallgrimur Jonasson
Hallgrimur Jonasson
Danish Superliga players
Allsvenskan players
Expatriate footballers in Sweden
Expatriate men's footballers in Denmark
GAIS players
SønderjyskE Fodbold players
Hallgrimur Jonasson
Odense Boldklub players
Lyngby Boldklub players
Hallgrimur Jonasson
Hallgrimur Jonasson